Megalagrion nigrohamatum is a species of damselfly in the family Coenagrionidae that is endemic to Hawaii.

References

Coenagrionidae
Insects of Hawaii
Endemic fauna of Hawaii
Odonata of Oceania
Critically endangered fauna of Hawaii
Insects described in 1884
Taxa named by Thomas Blackburn (entomologist)
Taxonomy articles created by Polbot